The Department of Communities, Child Safety and Disability Services is a department in the Queensland Government which is responsible for providing a number of social services. Ministers for Communities, Women and Youth, Minister for Child Safety and Minister for the Prevention of Domestic and Family Violence Shannon Fentiman, the Minister for Disability Services and Minister for Seniors Coralee O'Rourke and Minister for Multicultural Affairs Grace Grace are responsible for the department,. The department's head office is at 111 George Street in the Brisbane CBD.

The department has a range of focus areas in the delivery of human services including Aboriginal and Torres Strait Islander Services, child safety, disability, community care, housing, homelessness, multicultural affairs, sport, recreation and women. The department is divided across seven regions: South East, South West, Far North Queensland, North Queensland, North Coast, Brisbane and Central Queensland.

In 2009, the Department of Housing was abolished.  The Department of Communities assumed the responsibility for administering the Housing Act 2003.

Functions 
The Department of Communities is responsible for developing policy on community engagement, volunteering, crime prevention, family and domestic violence prevention, family support as well as support for individuals affected by problem gambling and alcohol abuse.  It also provides support to those dealing with homelessness, disaster recovery and enabling the aged and youth to engage government services and information.

See also

Queensland Housing Commission

References

External links
 

Communities